Welcome is an unincorporated community in Elko County, Nevada, United States.
Interstate 80 and Nevada State Route 230, between Deeth and Wells.

References

External links

Unincorporated communities in Nevada
Unincorporated communities in Elko County, Nevada
Elko, Nevada micropolitan area